This is a list of Croatian football transfers for the 2009 summer transfer window. Only moves featuring at least one Prva HNL club are listed.

Transfers

Croatian
2009
2009–10 in Croatian football
2008–09 in Croatian football